Teasing Master Takagi-san is an anime series adapted from the manga of the same title by Sōichirō Yamamoto. The series received a total of three television seasons and an animated film released in Japan on June 10, 2022.

Series overview

Episode list

Season 1 (2018)

Season 2 (2019)

Season 3 (2022)

Notes

References

External links
 

Teasing Master Takagi-san